This is a list of military equipment of the Czech Republic currently in service and in storage. This includes weapons and equipment of the Armed Forces of the Czech Republic, with the Army of the Czech Republic and its service branches, namely the Czech Land Forces and Czech Air Force, at their core.

Small arms and hand weapons

General purpose, standard issue

Specialist, reserve and other small arms and hand weapons

Vehicles
Equipment numbers as of 18 May 2022.

Ships

Aircraft

Other equipment

See also
 List of military aircraft of the Czech Republic

References

Czech Republic
Equipment
Czech Army